Skippy may refer to:

People 
  Skippy (nickname), a list of people

Arts and entertainments 
  Skippy (comic strip), an American strip published from 1923 to 1945.
 Skippy (film), based on the comics strip, released in 1931 and starring Jackie Cooper
 Skippy (radio series), a 1930s children's radio show based on the comic strip
 Skippy (dog), who portrayed Asta in The Thin Man film series (name changed to Asta after the first movie)
 Irwin "Skippy" Handelman, a recurring character on the American TV series Family Ties
 Skippy, a character and a segment title in Sunday Lovers, a 1980 anthology film
 The title character of Skippy the Bush Kangaroo, a live-action Australian television series
 Skippy: Adventures in Bushtown, animated television series
 Skippy, one of the Fun Girls, recurring characters on the American TV series The Andy Griffith Show
 "Skippy" (two versions), on the album Thelonious Monk Blue Note Sessions
 Daniel "Skippy" Juster, the title character of Skippy Dies, a 2010 tragicomic novel by Paul Murray
 Skippy Squirrel, a character from Animaniacs
 Skippy, a rabbit in Disney's Robin Hood.

Other uses 
 Skippy (peanut butter), an American brand
 Skippy (X), in computers a window management tool for X11
 Common name for Pseudocaranx georgianus, a fish found in Australia

See also 
 Standard Commands for Programmable Instruments, often pronounced "skippy"